Michael M. Adler is an American businessman who has served as the United States ambassador to Belgium since 2022.

Education 

Adler has a Bachelor of Business Administration from the University of Miami.

Joe Biden campaign and administration 

Adler met Joe Biden in 1973 when his sister, Karen, worked for Biden's U.S. Senate office. Adler served as Biden's national finance chair during his 2008 presidential campaign. Adler was a campaign surrogate during the 2020 election.

Ambassador to Belgium
In September 2021, President Biden nominated Adler to be the United States Ambassador to Belgium. Hearings on his nomination were held before the Senate Foreign Relations Committee on December 1, 2021. The committee favorably reported his nomination on December 15, 2021. On December 18, 2021, his nomination was confirmed in the United States Senate by voice vote. and presented his credentials on March 15, 2022.

Community involvement 

Adler served as chairman of Mount Sinai Medical Center where he sits on the Board of Trustees, President of the Greater Miami Jewish Federation where he was able to serve as a representative at the Conference of Presidents of Major American Jewish Organizations and as former Vice Chairman of Florida International University's Board of Trustees.

References

Living people
People from Miami
University of Miami Business School alumni
Ambassadors of the United States to Belgium
21st-century American diplomats
Florida Democrats
Biden administration personnel
Year of birth missing (living people)